John Scrope, 8th Baron Scrope of Bolton (c. 1510 – 22 June 1549) was the son of Henry Scrope, 7th Baron Scrope of Bolton and Mabel Dacre.

Around 1530 he married Catherine Clifford, daughter of Henry Clifford, 1st Earl of Cumberland in Skipton, Yorkshire. They had 11 children, of whom the eldest was his successor, Henry Scrope, 9th Baron Scrope of Bolton. He lived in the family home in Bolton Castle in Wensleydale, Yorkshire.

In 1536 he was pressured to support the Pilgrimage of Grace, a popular uprising in the Yorkshire area against the religious reforms of Henry VIII, particularly the break with Rome and the Dissolution of the Monasteries, and the policies of the King's chief minister, Thomas Cromwell, as well as other political, social and economic grievances.

He found himself obliged to grant sanctuary to Adam Sedbar, Abbot of Jervaulx, when the latter was on the run from the King's Commissioners, who had been sent north to round up the ringleaders. When the Commissioners arrived at Bolton Castle he fled to join his father-in-law at Skipton Castle but the Abbot was rounded up and ultimately executed. Before leaving the Commissioners fired the castle. However, because of the duress, he was deemed to have been put under he was forgiven and allowed to repair and reoccupy his home and retake his seat in Parliament.

Ancestry

References

1549 deaths
People from Richmondshire (district)
People associated with the Dissolution of the Monasteries
John
Year of birth uncertain
16th-century English nobility
8